Mehrabad Airport Terminal 4&6 Metro Station is a station in Tehran Metro Line 4's Mehrabad Branch, branching off from Bimeh Metro Station. It is located in Mehrabad Airport serving Terminal pairs 4 and 6.

Terminals 4 and 6 have the following function:

 Terminals 4 and 6 handle departures (Terminal 4) and arrivals (Terminal 6) for airlines other than Iran Air, Iran Air Tours, Meraj Airlines, Qeshm Air, Ata Airlines, Kish Air, and Zagros Airlines.

References

Tehran Metro stations